The Main Street Historic District is located in Trempealeau, Wisconsin. Buildings within in range from wooden Boomtown-style stores built around 1880 to the 1888 Queen Anne E. J. Hankey General Store, to the 1912 Prairie School Citizens State Bank, to Dr. Pierce's office, built in 1915.

References

Historic districts on the National Register of Historic Places in Wisconsin
National Register of Historic Places in Trempealeau County, Wisconsin